The 2000–01 Michigan State Spartans men's basketball team represented Michigan State University in the 2000–01 NCAA Division I men's basketball season. Tom Izzo, in his sixth year as head coach, led the team that played their home games at Breslin Center in East Lansing, Michigan and were members of the Big Ten Conference. The Spartans finished the season with a record of 28–5, 13–3 to finish in a tie for the Big Ten regular season championship for the fourth consecutive year. They received an at-large bid to the NCAA tournament. For the third consecutive year, they received a No. 1 seed and reached the Final Four before falling to Arizona.

Previous season 
The Spartans finished the 1999–2000 season as NCAA National champions with an overall record of 32–7 and in first place in the Big Ten with a 13–3 record. Michigan State received a No. 1 seed in the NCAA Tournament, their third straight trip to the Tournament, and won the National Championship, the second in school history, by beating Florida in the National Championship game.

The Spartans lost Mateen Cleaves (12.1 PPG, 1.8 RPG, 6.9 APG) and Morris Peterson (16.8 PPG, 6.0 RPG, 1.3 APG) to the NBA draft following the season.

Season summary 
Following their National Championship in 2000, Michigan State entered the regular season ranked No. 3 in both polls. The Spartans were led by freshman Zach Randolph (10.8 PPG, 6.7 RPG, 1.0 APG), sophomore Jason Richardson (14.7 PPG, 5.9 RPG, 2.2 APG), and seniors Charlie Bell (13.5 PPG, 4.7 RPG, 5.1 APG), and Andre Hutson (13.8 PPG, 7.6 RPG, 1.9 APG). MSU started the season strong, winning their first 12 games, including wins over No. 6 North Carolina, No. 8 Florida, and No. 8 Seton Hall. After beating Seton Hall, the Spartans ascended to the No. 1 ranking which they held for two weeks. MSU finished the non-conference season at 12–0.

After a loss in their second Big Ten game, MSU cruised through the Big Ten season with wins over No. 17 Wisconsin, No. 25 Iowa, and at No. 22 Wisconsin. finishing 13–3 and sharing the Big Ten Championship with Illinois. The championship marked the fourth consecutive Big Ten championship for the Spartans. The Spartans remained ranked in the top 5 during the entire season, ultimately finishing with a 24–3 overall record and ranked No. 2 in the country. MSU suffered a surprise defeat by Penn State in the Big Ten tournament in their attempt to win the tournament for the third consecutive year.

The Spartans were awarded a No. 1 seed, their third consecutive No. 1 seed, in the South Region of the NCAA Tournament. Seeking a repeat National Championship, MSU easily dispatched Alabama State and Fresno State to reach the Sweet Sixteen for the fourth consecutive year. A win over Gonzaga and Temple led to the school's third straight trip to the Final Four. However, they were unable to repeat as National Champions, losing to Arizona in the National Semifinal.

Following the season, Randolph and Richardson declared for the NBA draft.

Roster

Schedule and results

|-
!colspan=9 style=| Exhibition

|-
!colspan=9 style=| Non-conference regular season

|-
!colspan=9 style=|Big Ten regular season

|-
!colspan=9 style=|Big Ten tournament

|-
!colspan=9 style=|NCAA tournament

Rankings

*AP does not release post-NCAA Tournament rankings^Coaches did not release a week 2 poll

Awards and honors
Jason Richardson – All-Big Ten First Team
Jason Richardson – AP All-American Second Team
Charlie Bell – All-Big Ten First Team (Media), Second Team (Coaches)
Andre Hutson – All-Big Ten Second Team
Tom Izzo - NABC National Coach of the Year

References

Michigan State Spartans men's basketball seasons
Michigan State Spartans
NCAA Division I men's basketball tournament Final Four seasons
Michigan State
2000 in sports in Michigan
2001 in sports in Michigan